Unequal exchange is used primarily in Marxist economics, but also in ecological economics (more specifically also as ecologically unequal exchange), to denote forms of exploitation hidden in or underwriting trade. Originating, in the wake of the debate on the Singer–Prebisch thesis, as an explanation of the falling terms of trade for underdeveloped countries, the concept was coined in 1962 by the Greco-French economist Arghiri Emmanuel to denote an exchange taking place where the rate of profit has been internationally equalised, but wage-levels (or those of any other factor of production) have not. It has since acquired a variety of meanings, often linked to other or older traditions which perhaps then raise claims to priority.

In the works of Paul A. Baran, and subsequently adopted in the dependency approach of Andre Gunder Frank, there is a related but distinct concern with the transfer of values due to superprofits. This did not refer to the terms of trade, but to the transfer taking place within multinational corporations (called "monopolies"). Versions of unequal exchange originating within the dependency tradition are commonly based on some such concern with monopoly and center-periphery trade in general. Here, if unequal exchange occurs in trading, the effect is, that producers, investors and consumers incur either higher costs or lower incomes (or both) in the buying and selling of commodities than they would have, if the commodities had traded at their “real” or "true" value. In that case, they are disadvantaged in trading, and their market position is worsened, rather than strengthened. On the other side, the beneficiaries of the trade obtain a superprofit. This term implies that the beneficiaries of unequal exchange are capitalists or entrepreneurs, whereas as understood by Emmanuel the beneficiaries are the high-wage country consumers or workers.

The most renowned of those adopting the term is Samir Amin, who tried to link it to his own argument on the interdependent uneven development of rich and poor countries. Ernest Mandel also adopted the term, although his theory was based rather on that of the East-German Marxist Gunther Kohlmey. The most common approach within Marxism is to talk about unequal exchange whenever unequal labour values are being exchanged (e.g., John Roemer), and this type of approach has then been elaborated in recent decades by ecological economists, based instead on, e.g. ecological footprints or energy.

Depending on definition, the historical occurrence of unequal exchange can be traced to anything from the origins of trade itself, not limited to the capitalist mode of production, to the origins of significant international wage-differentials, or to the post-war appearance of a significant net-inflow of raw-materials to the developed countries. In the approach of Immanuel Wallerstein the origins of the modern world-system, or what others, such as Ernest Mandel, would call the rise of merchant capitalism, is said to have entailed unequal exchange, although the idea was criticised by Robert Brenner.

Another aspect of these theories is the criticism of fundamental assumptions of Ricardian and neoclassical theories of comparative advantage, which could be taken to imply that international trade would have the effect of equalising the economic position of the trading partners. More generally, the concept was a criticism of the idea that the operation of markets would have egalitarian effects, rather than accentuating the market position of the strong and disadvantaging the weak.

Modern liberal economists work under the assumption that value is essentially a question of style, moral behavior and the spirituality of individuals, not an economic issue. If unfair trading practices occur, it must be that there is an impediment to freely competitive markets; and if those markets or market access could be open, all would be fair. Marxian economists, on the other hand, argue that the cheap labor found in undeveloped economies allows for profit which would not be possible where wages are higher.  Raul Prebisch and Hans Singer hypothesized that the price of raw materials declines relative to finished industrial products.  This makes "peripheral" countries rich in resources tend towards less power in trade.

In Marxian economics 

Karl Marx aimed to go beyond moral discussion, in order to establish what, objectively speaking, real values are, how they are established, and what the objective regulating principles of trade are, basing himself principally on the insights of Adam Smith and David Ricardo (but many other classical political economists as well). He was no longer immediately concerned with what a "morally justified price" is, but rather with what "objective economic value" is, such as is established in real market activity and real trading practices.

Marx's answer is that "real value" is essentially the normal labour cost involved in producing it, its real production cost, measured in units of labour time or in cost-prices. Marx argues that the "real values" in a capitalist economy take the form of prices of production, defined as the sum of the average cost price (goods used up + labour costs + operating expenses) and the average profit reaped by the producing enterprises.

Formally, the exchange between Capital and Labour is equal in the marketplace, because, assuming everybody has free access to the market, and an adequate legal-security framework exists protecting people against
robbery, then all contractual relations are established through free and voluntary consent, on the basis of juridical equality of all citizens before
the law. If that equality breaks down, it can only be, because of immoral behaviour by citizens.

But Marx argues that, substantively, the transaction between Capital and Labour is unequal, because:

 Some economic agents enter the market with large assets they own, as private property, while other enter the market owning very little at all, except their capacity to do work of various kinds. That is to say, the bargaining power and bargaining positions of economic agents are differentially distributed, and this means, that private accumulation of capital occurs on the basis of appropriating surplus labour, either the surplus labour of the workers whom the owner of capital assets hires, or the surplus labour of workers hired by another owner of capital assets.
 External to the market, goods are produced by workers with a value in excess of labor-compensation, appropriated by the owners of productive capital assets. Marx's reference to unequal exchange refers therefore both to unequal exchange in production, and unequal exchange in trade.
 Another type of unequal exchange is a corollary of the tendency of the rate of profit to equalize under competitive conditions, insofar as producers obtain the ruling market prices for their output, irrespective of the different unit labor-costs of different producers of the same product.

In Das Kapital, however, Marx does not discuss unequal exchange in trade in detail, only unequal exchange in the sphere of production. His argument is that unequal exchange implied by labour contracts, is the basis for unequal exchange in trade, and without that basis, unequal exchange in trade could not exist, or would collapse. His aim was to show that exploitation could occur even on the basis of formally equal exchange.

Marx however also notes that unequal exchange occurs through production differentials as between different nations. Capitalists utilized this differential in several ways:

 By buying a product produced more cheaply in another nation, and selling it at home or elsewhere for a much higher price;
 By relocating the site of production to another nation where production costs are lower, because of lower input costs (wage costs and materials/equipment supply costs). That way, they pocketed an extra profit.
 By campaigning for protective tariffs shielding local industry from foreign competition.

That, Marxian economists argue, is essentially why the international dynamic of capital accumulation and market expansion takes the form of imperialism, i.e., an aggressive international competition process aimed at lowering costs, and increasing sales and profits.

As Marx put it,

Empirical indicators 

 The terms of trade. This refers to the relative prices of goods and services traded on international markets, specifically the weighted average of a nation's exports relative to its import prices, as indicated by the ratio of the export price index to the import price index, measured relative to a base year.
 Accounting analysis of product unit values, i.e., the composition of the various costs included in the final market price of a commodity (the price to the final consumer who uses or consumes the product). If for example it is found that an increasing fraction of that sale price represents costs other than direct production and transport costs, but instead profit, interest and rent income, then unequal exchange in trade has probably increased. But because of the "creative" gross and net income & expenditure accounting that is done, this is often not easy, since various incomes and expenditures are included under headings which make it difficult to understand what the costs were actually for, or what activity gave rise to the incomes.
 The change in the shares of net income between social classes and groups. If the discrepancy between the gross and net incomes of one social class, relative to another social class, increases, then a transfer of claims to wealth is occurring. This could be due to less income generated in production, or to income transferred in exchange (trading), or to taxation. We can compare also the actual average labour hours put in by one social class, to the net income accruing to that social class.
 The trend in the cost structure of production of a country as a whole, or particular sectors, which refers to the amount of capital expenditures not directly related to the actual production of a product, i.e. financial costs incurred in addition to materials, equipment and labour (interest payments, incidental expenses, insurance, taxes, rents and the like).
 The proportion of net profits, net rents, net interest payments and net property income transferred to other nations or obtained from other nations, such as is shown for example by the discrepancy between GDP and GNI and by Balance of Payments data, and the difference between imports and exports of goods and services.

Quantification of Unequal Exchange 
In a 2022 article for the journal Global Environmental Change, Jason Hickel et. al. approached to quantify the amount of unequal exchange between the global south and the global north between 1990 and 2015. They found unequal exchange to amount to over $10 trillion per year in Northern prices, creating a drain of raw materials, energy and labor.

See also 
 Arbitrage
 Balanced trade
 Capital accumulation
 Fair trade
 Singer–Prebisch thesis
 Trade
 United Nations Conference on Trade and Development
 Value-form
 Ecologically unequal exchange

References 

 ; more extensive draft version available at http://www.kallebrolin.com/Local%20Images%20Folder/portfoliostills/0TheBiasoftheWorld.pdf
 
 
 New Internationalist, "Free or fair trade - the facts"
  With contributions by Samir Amin, Christopher Chase-Dunn, Andre Gunder Frank, Immanuel Wallerstein.   
 Gernot Köhler, "Surplus value and transfer value"
 Gernot Köhler, Unequal exchange 1965-1995
 Gernot Köhler and Arno Tausch, Global Keynesianism: Unequal Exchange and Global Exploitation.
 Gernot Köhler, "Comparative advantage - comparative exploitation"
 Cem Somel, "Commodity chains, unequal exchange and uneven development", ERC working paper, September 2004. (PDF)
 Arghiri Emmanuel, Unequal exchange; A study of the imperialism of trade.
 Ernest Mandel, Late Capitalism.
 Samir Amin, L'echange inégal et la loi de la valeur.
 Samir Amin, Unequal Development.
 Samir Amin, Imperialism and Unequal Development.
 Raúl Prebisch, The economic development of Latin America and its principal problems.
 Peter Bauer, Dissent on Development: Studies and Debates in Development Economics.
 Klaus Busch, "Ungleicher Tausch – Zur Diskussion über internationale Durchschnittsprofitrate, ungleichen Tausch und komparative Kostentheorie anhand der Thesen von Arghiri Emmanuel", in: Probleme des Klassenkampfs, Nr. 8/9, Berlin 1973.
 ECONOMARX bibliography
 Alejandro's reference list
 Christian Palloix,Inégalité des échanges mondiaux ou inégalité du développement des forces productives à l'échelle mondiale ?. La Pensée, n. 150, mars-avril 1970.
 Christian Palloix, "The question of unequal exchange", in: Conference of Socialist Economists Bulletin, Spring 1972
 Michael Hudson, Trade, development and Foreign Debt (2 Vols). London: Pluto Press, 1992.
 Geoffrey Pilling, "Imperialism, Trade and 'Unequal Exchange': The work of Aghiri Emmanuel", Economy and Society, Vol. 2, 1973
 Milton & Rose Friedman, Free to Choose. New York: Harcourt, 1979.
 Arndt Hopfmann, Entwicklung, Gerechtigkeit und Weltmarkt - fur und wider das Theorem von Ungleichen Tausch 
 Richard Brown, The theory of unequal exchange : the end of the debate?, ISS occasional papers #65 The Hague : Institute of Social Studies, 1978.
 Joseph L. Love, "Raúl Previsch and the origins of the doctrine of unequal exchange", in: Latin American research review; 15(1980):no.3, p. 45-72.
 Reich, Peter-Utz, "Inequality in exchange", December 2006 
 
Communist Working Group, Unequal Exchange and the Prospects of Socialism. Copenhagen: Manifest Press, 1986.

External links 

 
 
 
 
 

Marxian economics
Ecological economics
Free trade imperialism
Imperialism studies